Dead Ant is a 2017 American comedy horror film directed by Ron Carlson, starring Tom Arnold, Sean Astin, Rhys Coiro, Jake Busey, and Leisha Hailey.

Cast
 Tom Arnold as Danny
 Sean Astin as Art
 Rhys Coiro as Pager
 Jake Busey as Merrick
 Leisha Hailey as Stevie
 Michael Horse as Bigfoot
 Danny Woodburn as Firecracker
 Cameron Richardson as Love
 Sydney Sweeney as Sam
 Joi Liaye as Lisa
 Cortney Palm as Candy
 Tristan Lake Leabu as Festival Victim
 Shevyn Roberts as Rock Star (uncredited)

Release
The film opened in limited theatres and was released to VOD on 25 January 2019.

Reception
Frank Scheck of The Hollywood Reporter called the film "the sort of effort that wears its cult movie aspirations so heavily on its sleeve that it they should bring back drive-in theaters to show it."

Noel Murray of the Los Angeles Times wrote that Carlson "does swiftly and skillfully move the story toward a surprisingly spectacular finish", while the cast "look like they’re all having a ball", and called the film "unapologetically “low art” … yet fun, in its own way."

Bobby LePire of Film Threat gave the film a score of 7/10 and wrote that while the film is "not quite the slam dunk it could be", that does not "deter from the sheer fun and energy of the production."

Nick Spacek of Starburst gave the film a score of 6/10 and wrote that the film's real appeal is "when the entirety of the cast and crew do their level best to make a solid film, despite budgetary limitations, rather than making excuses or shrugging things off."

References

External links
 
 

American comedy horror films
2017 comedy horror films